Joe Tetteh (10 December 1941 — 20 April 2002 (aged 60)) born in Accra was a Ghanaian professional super feather/light/light welterweight boxer of the 1950s, '60s and '70s who won the Ghanaian featherweight title, and inaugural British Commonwealth light welterweight title, and was a challenger for the West African featherweight title against Lat Shonibare, British Commonwealth featherweight title against Floyd Robertson, and All African lightweight title Ould Makloufi, his professional fighting weight varied from , i.e. super featherweight to , i.e. light welterweight.

Tetteh fought around the world as a professional boxer, including in Sweden, Australia, New Zealand, Italy, the United Kingdom—where he fought frequently—Spain and France. In his last bout as a professional, he boxed Ken Buchanan, being knocked out in three rounds by the Scottish future world champion and member of the International Boxing Hall of Fame.

References

External links

Image - Joe Tetteh

1941 births
2002 deaths
Lightweight boxers
Light-welterweight boxers
Boxers from Accra
Place of death missing
Welterweight boxers
Ghanaian male boxers